Follow Me My Queen is a 2015 Chinese romantic comedy film directed by Liu Xin. It was released on May 1, 2015, in China.

Cast
Lin Yongjian
Han Xue
Song Yunhao
Song Dandan
Li Jingjing

Reception
By May 8, 2015, the film had grossed  at the Chinese box office.

References

Chinese romantic comedy films
2015 romantic comedy films